ash-Shama'il al-Muhammadiyya is a collection of hadiths compiled by the 9th-century scholar al-Tirmidhi regarding the intricate details of the Islamic prophet Muhammad's life including his appearance, his belongings, his manners, and much more. The book contains 399 narrations from the successors of Muhammad which are divided into 56 chapters.

The best known and accepted of these hadith are attributed to Ali, cousin and son-in-law to Muhammad.  
Another well-known description is attributed to a woman named Umm Ma'bad.
Other descriptions are attributed to Aisha, `Abd Allah ibn `Abbas, Abu Hurairah and Hasan ibn Ali. While shama'il lists the physical and spiritual characteristics of Muhammad in simple prose, in hilya these are written about in a literary style.
Among other descriptive Shama'il text are the Dala'il al-Nubuwwah of Al-Bayhaqi, Tarih-i Isfahan of Abu Naeem Isfahani, Al-Wafa bi Fadha'il al-Mustafa of Abu'l-Faraj ibn al-Jawzi  and Al-Shifa of Qadi Ayyad are the main shemaa-il and hilya books.

Content of descriptions
The description of Muhammad by Ali, according to Tirmidhi, is as follows:

The description attributed by Umm Ma'bad goes as follows:

Muhammad's title as the "seal of the prophets" (i.e. the last of them, as it were the "seal" closing God's communication to man) is taken from Ali's description,

Between his two shoulders was the seal of prophethood, and he was the seal of the prophets

This "seal of prophethood" between Muhammad's shoulders is given a closer description in other texts of the hadith, and it is given a dedicated discussion in Sahih Muslim. 
It is depicted as a mole on the end of his left shoulder blade, in size compared to a pigeon's egg or an apple. A passage from Sunan Abu Dawood (32.4071), also collected in the Shama'il, reports how one Qurrah ibn Iyas al-Muzani on the occasion of swearing allegiance to Muhammad put his hand inside his shirt to "feel the seal".

Translations and Editions
The Shama'il is generally printed as an appendix to the Jami' of Tirmidhi in India and Pakistan. Professor M.H.F. Quraishi translated the Shama'il of Tirmidhi into English, which was published in 1980 in India.

An Urdu translation and commentary, Khasa'il-i Nabawi was written by  Muhammad Zakariya al-Kandahlawi.

An English translation and commentary, "A Commentary on the Depiction of Prophet Muhammad" was published in 2015.

An Uzbek translation and commentary, "Shamoili Muhammadiya" by Ziyovuddin Rahim was published in 2020.

See also 
 Hilya

References

External links
 Shama'il Muhammadiyah online at Sunnah.com
 Shamail Tirmidhi - English translation with Arabic chapters

Hadith collections
Cultural depictions of Muhammad
Sunni hadith collections